The speaker of the Northern Ireland Assembly (originally having the title of Presiding Officer) is the presiding officer of the Northern Ireland Assembly, elected on a cross-community vote by the Members of the Northern Ireland Assembly. A principal deputy speaker and two deputy speakers are elected to help fulfil the role. The office of Speaker is currently held (since January 2020) by the former MLA for Belfast West Alex Maskey of Sinn Féin.

The Office of the Speaker is located in Parliament Buildings, Stormont, Belfast. The speaker is also the Chairman of the Assembly Commission, the body corporate of the Assembly, and the Chairman of the Assembly Business Committee.

History
The first person to hold the position was Lord Alderdice, appointed by the Secretary of State for Northern Ireland in 1998.  Prior to devolution in December 1999 the position was referred to as the Initial Presiding Officer.  Alderdice left office in 2004.

Eileen Bell held the office of Speaker in the Assembly established under the Northern Ireland Act 2006 which met between May and October 2006 and in the Transitional Assembly established under the Northern Ireland (St Andrews Agreement) Act 2006 which met between November 2006 and May 2007.  Under the Northern Ireland (St Andrews Agreement) Act 2006 she was appointed Speaker of the Northern Ireland Assembly on 8 May 2007.

One of the first items of business for the Northern Ireland Assembly on 8 May 2007 was to elect a new speaker from the MLAs elected in March 2007.  The only nominee was William Hay, DUP member for Foyle and he was elected unopposed.

In May 2011 the new position of Principal Deputy Speaker was created. Sinn Féin deputy speaker Francie Molloy was subsequently elected to the new position in June 2011.

Election
During the first meeting of a new Assembly a speaker is elected. The oldest (by age) Member of the Assembly (see Father of the House) who is not seeking the appointment oversees the election as acting speaker. Nominees are then put forward, seconded and accepted by the nominee. A vote is then taken which must achieve the support of both sides of the house (cross-community support). A successful nominee is then deemed elected as Speaker and takes the chair. Upon election the speaker must relinquish all party political affiliations. The newly or re-elected speaker then oversees the selection of three deputy speakers.

Speakers

Deputy speakers

Current speaker and deputy speakers

See also
 Speaker of the Northern Ireland House of Commons
 Llywydd of the Senedd (equivalent position in Wales)
 Presiding Officer of the Scottish Parliament
 Speaker of the British House of Commons
 Lord Speaker
 Ceann Comhairle (equivalent position in the southern Irish Dáil or lower house of parliament)

References

External links
 Office of the Speaker

 
Northern Ireland Assembly
Northern Ireland
Northern Ireland